During the 2010 United Kingdom general election, a number of newspapers made endorsements of a political party.  This is an incomplete list.

A number of newspapers changed their endorsements from the previous general election, in 2005.  The most notable changes were those of The Sun, The Times, the Sunday Times  and the News of the World (all owned by News International), to the Conservative Party, having all backed Labour since 1997.

The Financial Times, the Evening Standard, The Economist also switched their endorsement from Labour to the Conservatives.  The Liberal Democrats picked up the endorsement of The Guardian and The Observer.

National newspapers

British Daily Newspapers

British Sunday newspapers

British news magazines

Regional newspapers

England

Northern Ireland

Scotland

Wales

See also
 List of newspapers in the United Kingdom
 Endorsements in the United Kingdom general election, 2015

Footnotes

General election, 2010
2010 United Kingdom general election
United Kingdom 2010
Newspapers published in the United Kingdom